Ricki Osterthun and Udo Riglewski were the defending champions, but Osterthun did not compete this year. Riglewski teamed up with Michael Stich and lost in the first round to Fabrice Santoro and Thierry Tulasne.

Alberto Mancini and Yannick Noah won the title by defeating Marcelo Filippini and Horst Skoff 6–4, 7–6 in the final.

Seeds

Draw

Draw

References

External links
 Official results archive (ATP)
 Official results archive (ITF)

Open de Nice Côte d'Azur
1990 ATP Tour